Friedrich Bischoff was a  cargo ship that was built in 1940 by Lübecker Maschinenbau Gesellschaft, Lübeck, Germany for German owners. She was sunk in an air raid in 1943, but later salvaged and returned to service. She was seized by the Allies in April 1945, passed to the Ministry of War Transport (MoWT) and renamed Empire Consequence. In 1947, she was transferred to the United States, and was sold into merchant service the following year. In 1951, she was sold to Finnish owners and renamed Kaisaniemi, serving until 1967 when she was scrapped.

Description
The ship was built by Lübecker Maschinenbau Geschellschaft, Lübeck. She was launched in 1940.

The ship had a GRT of 1,998 and a NRT of 1,065.

The engine was built by Ottenseult Steelworks, Altona, Hamburg.

History
Friedrich Bisschoff was built for Argo Reederei Richard Adler & Co. On 13 December 1943, she was sunk in an Allied air raid on Bremen. She was salvaged, repaired and returned to service. In May 1945, Friedrich Bisschoff was seized by the Allies at Copenhagen, Denmark. She was passed to the MoWT and renamed Empire Consequence. She was placed under the management of Shipping & Coal Co Ltd. Her port of registry was changed to London. The Code Letters GFSX and United Kingdom Official Number 180707 were allocated. On 7 April 1947, she was allocated to the United States Maritime Commission and laid up in the Hudson River.

On 8 March 1948, Empire Consequence was sold to Alaska Transport Corp, Tacoma, Washington. In 1950, she was sold to Norton Clapp, Seattle, Washington. In 1951, Empire Consequence was sold to Etelä-Suomen Laiva Oy, Helsinki, Finland and was renamed Kaisaniemi. The Code Letters OFRB and Finnish Official Number 1098 were allocated and her port of registry was changed to Helsinki. She was operated under the management of Polttoaine Osuuskunta, Helsinki until 1959, and then under the management of K S Laaksonen, Helsinki until 1961, after which Etelä-Suomen Laiva operated the ship themselves. In 1962, Kaisaniemi was classified as ice class 1A, She was transferred from Lloyd's Register to Det Norske Veritas in that year. She served until 1967, when she was scrapped at Grimstad, Norway.

References

1940 ships
Ships built in Lübeck
Steamships of Germany
World War II merchant ships of Germany
Cargo ships sunk by aircraft
Maritime incidents in December 1943
Ministry of War Transport ships
Empire ships
Steamships of the United Kingdom
Merchant ships of the United Kingdom
Steamships of the United States
Merchant ships of the United States
Steamships of Finland
Merchant ships of Finland